Phytoecia acridula is a species of beetle in the family Cerambycidae. It was described by Holzschuh in 1981. It is known from Tajikistan.

References

Phytoecia
Beetles described in 1981